The 1935 All-Ireland Senior Football Championship Final was the 48th All-Ireland Final and the deciding match of the 1935 All-Ireland Senior Football Championship, an inter-county Gaelic football tournament for the top teams in Ireland.

Cavan won by four points after Kildare centre back Jack Higgins was injured. The Lilywhites (Kildare) would not reach the All-Ireland final again for another sixty-three years. They also lost that final, this time to Galway, in 1998.

References

All-Ireland Senior Football Championship Final
All-Ireland Senior Football Championship Final, 1935
All-Ireland Senior Football Championship Finals
Cavan county football team matches
Kildare county football team matches